Gaddi Annaram is a census town and Municipality in Ranga Reddy district of India. It is located in the common capital area shared between the states of Telangana and Andhra Pradesh.

Geography
It has an average elevation of 481 meters (1581 feet).

Demographics
 India census, Gaddi annaram had a population of 53,622. Males constitute 52% of the population and females 48%. Gaddi annaram has an average literacy rate of 81%, higher than the national average of 59.5%: male literacy is 85%, and female literacy is 76%. In Gaddi annaram, 11% of the population is under 6 years of age.

References

Cities and towns in Ranga Reddy district